John Hunter Devine (born 1 December 1935), also known as Hunter Devine, is a Scottish former amateur footballer who played as an inside forward for Queen's Park between 1953 and 1961. Devine represented Great Britain at the 1960 Summer Olympics and also played in non-League football.

Personal life 
In the early 1960s, Devine moved to London to work as an actuary for Scottish Amicable Building Society.

Career statistics

Honours 
Queen's Park

 Scottish League Division Two: 1955–56

References

External links 

 

1935 births
Living people
Scottish footballers
Queen's Park F.C. players
Scottish Football League players
Footballers at the 1960 Summer Olympics
Olympic footballers of Great Britain
Scotland amateur international footballers
Association football forwards

Hounslow F.C. players
Dulwich Hamlet F.C. players
Isthmian League players
British actuaries